Chertan (Surtan) is a rural locality (a selo) in Duvansky Selsoviet, Duvansky District, Bashkortostan, Russia. The population was 242 as of 2010. There are 3 streets.

Geography 
Chertan is located 32 km northwest of Mesyagutovo (the district's administrative centre) by road. Duvan is the nearest rural locality.

References 

Rural localities in Duvansky District